Shin Yung-Suk  (Hangul: 신영석; born ) is a South Korean male volleyball player. He was part of the South Korea men's national volleyball team at the 2014 FIVB World Championship in Poland. He currently plays for the Suwon KEPCO Vixtorm.

Career

Clubs
Shin was selected with the second overall pick in the first round by the Woori Capital Dream Six in the 2008 V-League Draft behind Moon Sung-min. Shin subsequently became a  starting middle blocker for the team in his rookie season.

Shin led the V-League in blocks per set in three consecutive seasons (2010–11, 2011–12 and 2012–13) before he was traded to the Hyundai Capital Skywalkers in 2014.

In the 2016–17 season, Shin won his first championship, leading the Skywalkers to their third V-League title. He was named Best Middle Blocker of the season as well.

National team
Shin first garnered attention in 2004 when he won the gold medal at the 2004 Asian Junior Championship as part of the South Korean junior national team.

While attending Kyonggi University in 2005, Shin got called-up to the South Korean national under-21 team for the 2005 World Junior (U21) Championship, where South Korea finished in sixth place.

In May 2007 Shin first joined the South Korean senior national team to compete in the 2007 FIVB World League, where South Korea finished ninth for its best result since 1995. In November 2007 Shin also took part in the 2007 FIVB World Cup as part of the national team.

At the inaugural AVC Cup, Shin played as the starting middle blocker in all six matches and helped Team Korea to the gold medal match, where they lost to Asia No. 1 Iran in full sets.

Shin was part of the South Korean national team that won the 2014 AVC Cup when the team defeated India 3-0 in the final match.

Individual awards

Club
 2010 V-League - Rookie of the Year
 2017 V-League - Best Middle Blocker

National Team
 2019 Asian Championship – Best Middle Blocker

References

External links
 Shin Yung-suk at the International Volleyball Federation (FIVB)

1986 births
Living people
South Korean men's volleyball players
Place of birth missing (living people)
Asian Games medalists in volleyball
Volleyball players at the 2010 Asian Games
Volleyball players at the 2014 Asian Games
Medalists at the 2010 Asian Games
Medalists at the 2014 Asian Games
Asian Games bronze medalists for South Korea
Sportspeople from Gyeonggi Province
21st-century South Korean people